East Borneo Region, was a component entity of the United States of Indonesia in eastern part of Borneo.  It was established on 12 May 1947 with capital at Samarinda. East Borneo was dissolved on 24 March 1950 and became part of Kalimantan Province which was formed on 14 August 1950 with its capital at Banjarmasin.  Following the division of Kalimantan Province, the former territory of East Borneo was assigned to East Kalimantan in 1956.

Person of interests
 Adji Mohammad Parikesit
 Adji R. Aflus
 Adji R. Djokoprawiro

References

Indonesian National Revolution
States and territories established in 1947
States and territories disestablished in 1950